The Conway Seashore Railroad was a South Carolina railroad that operated in the early 20th century.  It ran from Conway, South Carolina southeast to Myrtle Beach, South Carolina.

History
The Conway Seashore Railroad was chartered by the South Carolina General Assembly in 1899. It began operation in 1900 and in 1904 the name of the carrier was changed to the Conway Coast and Western Railroad.

The Conway Seashore was bought by the Atlantic Coast Line Railroad (ACL) in 1912, who had previously bought the Wilmington, Chadbourn and Conway Railroad in 1898.  This gave the ACL a continuous route from their main line at Elrod, North Carolina to Myrtle Beach via Chadbourn, North Carolina and Conway, which was then known as their Conway and Myrtle Beach Branch.  The ACL operated both freight and passenger service to Myrtle Beach.

The Atlantic Coast Line became the Seaboard Coast Line Railroad in 1967 after merging with their former rival, the Seaboard Air Line Railroad.  The Seaboard Coast Line Railroad designated the line as the Myrtle Beach Subdivision.  In 1980, the Seaboard Coast Line's parent company merged with the Chessie System, creating the CSX Corporation.  The CSX Corporation initially operated the Chessie and Seaboard Systems separately until 1986, when they were merged into CSX Transportation.

Current operation
Today, the line is still in place and it is owned by the R.J. Corman Railroad Group  R.J. Corman acquired the line and restored freight service up to Pine Island in 2015.  However, tracks to Myrtle Beach proper are inactive since the drawbridge over the Intracoastal Waterway between Pine Island and Myrtle Beach is currently inoperable.

Stations

References

Defunct South Carolina railroads
Railway companies established in 1899
Railway companies disestablished in 1904
1899 establishments in South Carolina